The Himalayan Languages Project, launched in 1993, is a research collective based at Leiden University and comprising much of the world's authoritative research on the lesser-known and endangered languages of the Himalayas, in Nepal, China, Bhutan, and India. Its members regularly spend months or years at a time doing field research with native speakers. The Director of the Himalayan Languages Project is George van Driem; other top authorities include Mark Turin and Jeroen Wiedenhof. It recruits grad students to collect new field research on little-known languages as the topics for their Ph.D. dissertations.

The Himalayan Languages Project was officially commissioned by the government of Bhutan to devise a standard romanization of Dzongkha.

Since George van Driem's move to the University of Bern, many members of the Himalayan Languages Project are now based out of Switzerland.

Languages studied 
Many of the languages studied by the Project are believed to be doomed to extinction in the next few years or decades, and might be lost to human knowledge but for the efforts of the Project.

The Project has completed comprehensive grammars of the following languages:
Limbu
Dumi
Dzongkha
Wambule
Kulung
Jero

The Project is currently working on comprehensive grammars of the following languages:
Manchad
Lohorung
Thangmi
Sunwar
Lhokpu
Sampang
Gongduk
Olekha
Chɨlɨng
Gyalrong
Lepcha
Chulung
Dhimal

The Project has completed grammatical sketches of the following languages:
Bumthang
Byangsi
Puma
Rabha
Rongpo

The Project is currently working on grammatical sketches of the following languages:
Baram
Dura
Toto

The Project also studied the fall into apparent extinction of the language Kusunda in Nepal, as its last speakers, who lived in the forest and subsisted by hunting, were absorbed and dispersed into the larger society.

Himalayan Languages Symposium 
Members of the Himalayan Languages Project also regularly organise the Himalayan Languages Symposium, an annual conference on Trans-Himalayan languages. Conferences have been held annually since 1995.

Below is a list of past conferences.

See also 
Sino-Tibetan Etymological Dictionary and Thesaurus

References

External links 
Himalayan Languages Project official website
The Kirat Rai Association's Web Portal

Linguistic research
Organizations established in 1993
Leiden University
1993 establishments in the Netherlands